Sergey Mikhailovich Koltakov (10 December 1955 – 7 September 2020) was a Soviet and Russian actor.

Biography 
Sergey Koltakov was born in Barnaul, Altai Krai, Russian SFSR, Soviet Union.
He studied at the Saratov Drama School in the acting department (1975-1976). In 1979 he graduated from the acting department Russian Academy of Theatre Arts.

He made his debut in cinema in 1981 in Gleb Panfilov's Valentina in the role of Pavel. Notoriety in cinema came three years later, after shooting Inna Tumanyan's Partners, when playing the role of a criminal  Anatoly.

The actor starred in many years of perestroika, playing a completely different role. Among his works, his role in films  Mirror for a Hero (directed by Vladimir Khotinenko), The Art of Living in Odessa (Georgi Yungvald-Khilkevich),  Armavir (Vadim Abdrashitov).

Since the beginning of the 1990s Koltakov starred in the movies less often. For his performance as Svidrigailov in the play Dreams of Rodion Romanovich in 2006 (814 Theatre Association of Oleg Menshikov) was nominated for the  Seagull Theater Award.

In 2008 he was awarded the Prize of the Federal Security Service.

Filmography 
1981 —  Valentina as Pavel
1983 —  Partners as Anatoly Tredubenko
1986 —  In Shooting Solitude as Fedor Krohov
1986 —  Triple jump  Panther as Babichev, a former prisoner
1987 —  Two of the island of tears as Seva
1987 — Mirror for a Hero as Sergey Kirillovich Pshenichny
1988 — New Adventures of a Yankee in King Arthur's Court as Hank Morgan
1988 — The Life of Klim Samgin as Makarov
1989 — Soothe My Sorrows as Boris
1989 — The Art of Living in Odessa as Benya Krik
1991 — Armavir as Semin
1995 — Running People as engineer Suslov
1998 — Greetings from Charlie-blower as Felix
 1998 — Mama Don't Cry as Belsky 
 1999 — Strastnoy Boulevard as  Andrei Sokolov
2004 — Children of the Arbat as Solts
2005 —  Thrown  as Major Genin
2005 — Destructive Power 6 as Krutikov
2005 — Mama Don't Cry 2 as Belsky
 2008 — Novaya Zemlya as Makhov
2008 — Save Our Souls as Burtasov, NKVD colonel
2008 — The Brothers Karamazov as Fyodor Pavlovich Karamazov
2009 — Kakraki as Andrei Vasilyev
2009 — Pelagia and the White Bulldog as  Kirill Krasnov, the landowner
2009 — Attack on Leningrad as Andrei Zhdanov
2011 — The PyraMMMid as Prime Minister
2011 — Summer Wolves as Denis Pankratovich Semerenkov
2012 — Novel with Cocaine as lawyer Mintz
 2012 — Conductor as Evgeny Nadezhdin, tenor
 2012 — The Dark Side of the Moon as Vsevolod Ukolov, actor
2012 — The Exception to the Rule as Vasily Lomov
2013 — Dr. Death as Anton Mets
2014 — Leaving Nature as Andrey Yurevich Zvonarev, filmmaker
2017 — The Road to Calvary as Dmitry Bulavin
2019 — Union of Salvation as Nikolay Mordvinov, senator
2020 — The Silver Skates as Dmitri Mendeleev

References

External links
 
 Sergey Koltakov at KinoPoisk

1955 births
2020 deaths
People from Barnaul
Russian male film actors
Russian male stage actors
Russian male television actors
Soviet male film actors
Soviet male stage actors
Soviet male television actors
20th-century Russian male actors
Burials in Troyekurovskoye Cemetery
Russian Academy of Theatre Arts alumni
Deaths from cancer in Russia